Darum leben wir ("That Is Why We Live") is the second studio album by German singer Cassandra Steen. It was released by Universal Urban on 20 February 2009 in German-speaking Europe. Darum leben wir marked Steen's first release after parting ways with her long-time collaborators Moses Pelham and Martin Haas and their record label 3P. The singer worked with Marek Pompetzki and Paul NZA on the majority of the album, while additional production was provided by Mathias Grosch, Andreas Herbig, and Oliver Pinelli. Steen's biggest commercial success, it was certified gold by the Bundesverband Musikindustrie (BVMI), indicating sales in excess of 100,000 units.

Track listing

Notes
 denotes co-producer

Charts

Weekly charts

Year-end charts

Certifications

Release history

References

External links
 

2009 albums
Cassandra Steen albums